Dynamite Duumvirate Tag Team Title Tournament (2007) was the first Dynamite Duumvirate Tag Team Title Tournament (DDT4) produced by Pro Wrestling Guerrilla (PWG). It was a two-night event, taking place on May 19 and May 20, 2007 at the Burbank Armory in Burbank, California.

It was an eight-team tournament contested for the vacant PWG World Tag Team Championship. PAC and Roderick Strong defeated The Briscoe Brothers (Jay Briscoe and Mark Briscoe) in the final to win the inaugural DDT4 tournament and the vacant titles.

Production

Background
On March 14, 2007, it was announced that an eight-team tournament would take place for the vacant PWG World Tag Team Championship across two nights on May 19 and May 20, 2007 at the Bernard Milken Jewish Community Centre in West Hills, Los Angeles, California. The tournament, later titled Dynamite Duumvirate Tag Team Title Tournament (DDT4) after the DDT finishing move, was later shifted to Burbank Armory in Burbank, California.

Storylines

Original line-up
At Guitarmageddon II: Armorygeddon, Cape Fear (El Generico and Quicksilver) successfully defended the PWG World Tag Team Championship against Davey Richards and Roderick Strong. However, Quicksilver suffered a major concussion during the match, resulting in Excalibur, the newly appointed Commissioner of Food and Beverage, to strip Cape Fear of the titles at Album of the Year. PWG Commissioner Dino Winwood announced that a tournament would occur to determine the new champions. The originally announced participants of DDT4 were:

Arrogance (Chris Bosh and Scott Lost)
The Briscoe Brothers (Jay Briscoe and Mark Briscoe)
Jack Evans and Roderick Strong
The Motor City Machine Guns (Alex Shelley and Chris Sabin)
The Havana Pitbulls (Ricky Reyes and Rocky Romero)
The Kings of Wrestling (Chris Hero and Claudio Castagnoli)
Muscle Outlaw'z (Masato Yoshino and Naruki Doi)
Davey Richards and a mystery partner

Replacements
Due to PWG terminating its working relationship with Total Nonstop Action Wrestling in May, TNA-contracted wrestlers Motor City Machine Guns were unable to compete in DDT4. As a result, Dino Winwood replaced Motor City Machine Guns with The Trailer Park Boyz (Josh Abercrombie and Nate Webb). Jack Evans was forced to withdraw from the competition due to commitments in Japan, forcing him to be replaced by PAC as Roderick Strong's partner. Davey Richards' former co-holder of the World Tag Team Championship, Super Dragon was revealed to be his partner in DDT4.

Non-tournament matches
PAC was originally scheduled to compete against Bryan Danielson's opponent on the night one of DDT4, but after PAC's participation in DDT4, CIMA was announced as his replacement.

Dino Winwood awarded a PWG World Championship title shot to Kevin Steen on the night one of DDT4, against El Generico. A match was scheduled by Steen and Ronin on night two, which would become a title match if Steen was able to beat Generico for the title. Similarly, a match was scheduled between Generico and CIMA on night two, which would become a World Championship match if Generico was able to retain the title against Steen.

After losing to Davey Richards in the opening round of the 2006 Battle of Los Angeles, Ronin began a quest to participate in the 2007 Battle of the Los Angeles and win the tournament. This quest was called Battle of Los Angeles Tour. He embarked on a nine-match winning streak to convince PWG management to include him in the tournament. At 70/30, Ronin competed against Kevin Steen in a #1 contender's match for the PWG World Championship, but the match abruptly ended after Joey Ryan interfered in the match by attacking Steen. At All Star Weekend V, Ronin pinned Ryan's friend Karl Anderson in a six-man tag team match, but Anderson attacked Ronin after the match. As a result, an enraged Ronin challenged Ryan to a match on the night one of DDT4, but Ryan refused to wrestle if there was no benefit to him. Ronin agreed to put his Battle of the Los Angeles spot on the line in the match to convince Ryan to wrestle. However, Excalibur announced that Ryan must put something on the line as well, and Ryan agreed to put his hair on the line.

Reception
TJ Hawke of 411Mania gave mixed reviews to night one of the tournament, rating it 6.5. He considered the event, "a mixed bag", stating "that the non-tournament matches delivered more consistently than the tournament ones." He felt that "The Havana Pitbulls and Trailer Park Boys were subtractions by addition", and enjoyed "the Briscoes/Kings match more than I expected."

He felt that the night two was "an incredibly underwhelming show given the level of talent involved." According to him, "Bryan Danielson and Kevin Steen were completely wasted." He stated that "The tournament matches continued to disappoint (up until the finals)."

Aftermath
The feud between Scorpio Sky and Joey Ryan continued as Sky cost Ryan, a match against Tyler Black at Roger Dorn Night. After the match, Ryan demanded that Commissioner Dino Winwood prevent Sky from appearing in PWG. Winwood then scheduled an unsanctioned street fight between Sky and Ryan at Giant-Size Annual #4, due to Sky unable to compete in PWG after losing a Loser Leaves PWG match to Frankie Kazarian at Based On A True Story earlier in the year. The match stipulated that Sky would be no longer allowed to appear in any PWG event if he lost but if he won, he would be reinstated.

Results

Tournament brackets

References

External links
Pro Wrestling Guerrilla official website

Dynamite Duumvirate Tag Team Title Tournament
2007 in professional wrestling
May 2007 sports events in the United States
2007 in California
Professional wrestling in California